The Regiment is a British television drama series produced by the BBC. First broadcast on BBC One in 1972 it starred Christopher Cazenove and followed the story of a British Army regiment from the view of two families.

The Regiment was based on a single play broadcast in 1970 as part of the BBC Drama Playhouse series. The series followed the Cotswold Regiment from 1895 to 1904, and in particular the Gaunt and Bright families. The first series was broadcast in 1972 and related to the regiment's time in South Africa, fighting in the Boer War, while the second series in 1973 followed the regiment on a posting to British India.

It once received a brief review in the Glasgow Weekly News "The Regiment: ought to be disbanded".

The theme music to the series was the finale of the Triumphal March from "Caractacus" by Sir Edward Elgar.

Cast List

References

External links

BBC television dramas
1970s British drama television series
1972 British television series debuts
1973 British television series endings